Betto is a surname. Notable people with the surname include:

 Alice Betto (born 1987), Italian triathlete
 Frei Betto (born 1944), Brazilian writer and theologist 
 Kaoru Betto (1920–1999), Japanese baseball player

See also
 Blessed Betto (sixth century), father of St. Lupus of Sens